Hazel Robson (born 22 August 1979) is a Paralympian athlete from Great Britain competing mainly in category T36 sprint events.

Hazel competed in the 2004 Summer Paralympics in Athens in the 200m and 400m having won the gold medal in the 100m in Sydney four years earlier.  Four years later, competing under her married name of Simpson, she failed to defend the 100m title finishing second behind China's Wang Feng who also beat her into second in the 200m.

External links
 profile on paralympic.org
 Profile on ParalympicsGB

Paralympic athletes of Great Britain
Athletes (track and field) at the 2000 Summer Paralympics
Athletes (track and field) at the 2004 Summer Paralympics
Athletes (track and field) at the 2008 Summer Paralympics
Athletes (track and field) at the 2012 Summer Paralympics
Paralympic gold medalists for Great Britain
Paralympic silver medalists for Great Britain
British female sprinters
Living people
1979 births
Medalists at the 2000 Summer Paralympics
Medalists at the 2004 Summer Paralympics
Medalists at the 2008 Summer Paralympics
Paralympic bronze medalists for Great Britain
Paralympic medalists in athletics (track and field)